Atom Egoyan  (born July 19, 1960) is a Canadian filmmaker. He was part of a loosely-affiliated group of filmmakers to emerge in the 1980s from Toronto known as the Toronto New Wave. Egoyan made his career breakthrough with Exotica (1994), a film set primarily in and around the fictional Exotica strip club. Egoyan's most critically acclaimed film is the drama The Sweet Hereafter (1997), for which he received two Academy Award nominations, and his biggest commercial success is the erotic thriller Chloe (2009). He is considered by local film critic Geoff Pevere to be one of the greatest filmmakers of his generation.

Egoyan's work often explores themes of alienation and isolation, featuring characters whose interactions are mediated through technology, bureaucracy, or other power structures. Egoyan's films often follow non-linear plot structures, in which events are placed out of sequence in order to elicit specific emotional reactions from the audience by withholding key information.

In 2008, Egoyan received the Dan David Prize for "Creative Rendering of the Past." Egoyan later received the Governor General's Performing Arts Award, Canada's highest royal honour in the performing arts, in 2015.

Early life and education
Egoyan was born Atom Yeghoyan on July 19, 1960, in Cairo, then in the United Arab Republic (now Egypt), to Armenian-Egyptian painters Shushan and Joseph Yeghoyan. He was named Atom to mark the completion of Egypt's first nuclear reactor. He has a younger sister, Eve. In 1963, the family immigrated to Victoria, British Columbia, due to the rise of Arab nationalism, and changed their last name to Egoyan.

As a teenager, Egoyan became interested in reading and writing plays. Influences included Samuel Beckett and Harold Pinter. He also attributes his future in the film industry to Persona (1966), which he viewed at age 14, according to an interview he had with journalist Robert K. Elder for The Film That Changed My Life:

Egoyan graduated from Trinity College at the University of Toronto. It was at Trinity College that he came into contact with Harold Nahabedian, the Armenian-Canadian Anglican Chaplain of Trinity College. In interviews, Egoyan credited Nahabedian for introducing him to the language and history of his ethnic heritage. Egoyan also wrote for the University of Toronto's independent weekly, The Newspaper, during his time at the school.

Career 
Egoyan began making films in the early 1980s; his debut film Next of Kin (1984) world-premiered at the International Filmfestival Mannheim-Heidelberg and won a major prize. He directed the 1985 Twilight Zone episode "The Wall". His commercial breakthrough came with the film Exotica (1994). He received the Grand Prix (Belgian Film Critics Association) in Brussels, the FIPRESCI Jury Prize at the Cannes Film Festival, and Best Motion Picture at the Canadian Screen Awards (then called the Genie Awards). However, it was Egoyan's first attempt at adapted material that resulted in his best-known work, The Sweet Hereafter (1997), which earned him three prizes at the 50th Cannes Film Festival: the Grand Prix, the FIPRESCI Jury Prize, and the Prize of the Ecumenical Jury. The film also earned Egoyan Academy Award nominations for Best Director and Best Adapted Screenplay.

The film Ararat (2002) generated much publicity for Egoyan. After Henri Verneuil's French-language film Mayrig (1991), it was the first major motion picture to deal directly with the Armenian genocide. Ararat later won the award for Best Motion Picture at the Canadian Screen Awards, marking his third win. The film was released in over 30 countries around the world. In 2004, Egoyan opened Camera Bar, a 50-seat cinema-lounge on Queen Street West in Toronto. The bar has since closed.

Beginning in September 2006, Egoyan taught at the University of Toronto for three years. He joined the Faculty of Arts and Science as the Dean's Distinguished Visitor in theatre, film, music, and visual studies. He subsequently taught at Ryerson University. In 2006, he received the Master of Cinema Award of the International Filmfestival Mannheim-Heidelberg.

In 2009, he directed the erotic thriller Chloe, which was theatrically released by Sony Pictures Classics on March 26, 2010. This film grossed $3 million in box office sales in the United States and became one of the higher-grossing specialty films of the year in the United States. Several months after the DVD/Blu-ray release of Chloe, Egoyan said that Chloe had made more money than any of his previous films. The success of Chloe led Egoyan to receive many scripts of erotic thrillers.

In 2012, he directed a production of Martin Crimp's Cruel and Tender, starring Khanjian, at Canadian Stage in Toronto.

After the release of the West Memphis Three from 18 years in prison, Egoyan directed a movie about the case called Devil's Knot (2013) starring Reese Witherspoon and Colin Firth, based on a book, Devil's Knot: The True Story of the West Memphis Three by Mara Leveritt. His next feature, The Captive (2014), starred Ryan Reynolds and screened in competition for the Palme d'Or at the 2014 Cannes Film Festival, where it received largely negative reviews from critics. Justin Chang from Variety described the film as "a ludicrous abduction thriller that finds a once-great filmmaker slipping into previously un-entered realms of self-parody."

In 2015, Egoyan directed the thriller Remember, which starred Christopher Plummer and premiered at the Toronto International Film Festival in September, before being given a limited release in theatres. His latest film is the drama Guest of Honour, was nominated for a Golden Lion in competition in Venice in 2019, had a Special Presentation at the Toronto International Film Festival, and opening night galas in Vancouver and Montreal.

Beginning around 1996, Egoyan has directed several operas, including Salome, Così fan tutte, and The Ring Cycle, at the Canadian Opera, Vancouver Opera, Pacific Opera Victoria, and elsewhere.

Personal life 
Egoyan is based in Toronto, where he lives with his wife, actress Arsinée Khanjian, who appears in many of his films, and their son, Arshile (named after the Armenian-American painter Arshile Gorky).

In 1999, Egoyan was made an Officer of the Order of Canada; he was promoted in 2015 to Companion of the Order of Canada, the highest grade of the honour. In 2009, he won the 'Master of Cinema' award from the Mannheim Film Festival, 25 years after receiving his international festival premiere at the same event. In 2017, Egoyan was presented with the Lifetime Achievement Award at the International Film Festival of India.

Filmography

Feature films

TV films
 In This Corner (1986)
 Gross Misconduct (1993)
 Sarabande (1997)
 Krapp's Last Tape (2000)

Short films
 Howard in Particular (1979)
 After Grad with Dad (1980)
 Peep Show (1981)
 Open House (1982)
 Men: A Passion Playground (1985)
 Looking for Nothing (1988)
 Montreal Stories (Montréal vu par...) (1991)
 segment: En passant (In Passing)
 A Portrait of Arshile (1995)
 The Line (2000)
 Diaspora (2001)
 Chacun son cinéma / To Each His Own Cinema (2007)
 segment: Artaud Double Bill
 Venezia 70 Future Reload (2013)
 segment: Butterfly
 Festival du Nouveau Cinéma (2014)
 segment: L'Apparition (d'après René Magritte)

Documentary films
 Citadel (2003)

Bibliography
 Dear Sandra, Volumina (2007)

References

External links

 Ego Film Arts – official website
 Atom Egoyan – faculty page at European Graduate School (includes biography and video lectures)
 
 
 Order of Canada citation
 CTV.ca Filmmaker Egoyan set to teach at U. of Toronto
 Discussion of Egoyan's film, Calendar by Ron Burnett 
 Literature on Atom Egoyan

1960 births
Living people
20th-century Canadian male writers
20th-century Canadian screenwriters
21st-century Armenian male writers
21st-century Armenian screenwriters
21st-century Canadian male writers
21st-century Canadian screenwriters
Armenian expatriates in Switzerland
Armenian film directors
Armenian film producers
Armenian theatre directors
Best Director Genie and Canadian Screen Award winners
Best Screenplay Genie and Canadian Screen Award winners
Canadian expatriates in Switzerland
Canadian people of Armenian descent
Canadian theatre directors
Citizens of Armenia through descent
Companions of the Order of Canada
Egyptian emigrants to Canada
Academic staff of European Graduate School
Film directors from Toronto
Film directors from Victoria, British Columbia
Film producers from British Columbia
Film producers from Ontario
French-language film directors
German-language film directors
Governor General's Performing Arts Award winners
Screenwriters from British Columbia
Screenwriters from Ontario
Trinity College (Canada) alumni
University of Toronto alumni
Film people from Cairo
Writers from Toronto
Writers from Victoria, British Columbia